Toahotu is an associated commune located in the commune of Taiarapu-Ouest on the island of Tahiti, in French Polynesia.

References

Towns and villages in Tahiti